Miguel Angel Navarro (born 12 October 1941) is an Argentine former swimmer. He competed in two events at the 1964 Summer Olympics.

References

1941 births
Living people
Argentine male swimmers
Olympic swimmers of Argentina
Swimmers at the 1964 Summer Olympics
Place of birth missing (living people)
20th-century Argentine people